Galifianakis is a Greek surname.  Notable people with the name include:

Nick Galifianakis (politician) (born 1928), American politician and Democratic U.S. Congressman from North Carolina between 1967 and 1973, uncle of Zach
Nick Galifianakis (cartoonist) (born 1962), American cartoonist and artist who draws satirical cartoons, first cousin of Zach
Zach Galifianakis (born 1969), American actor, comedian and writer

Greek-language surnames
Surnames